Ghalöön is a large village in Nadaun tehsil of the Hamirpur district in the Indian state of Himachal Pradesh.

Geography 
Ghalöön is located about 8 kilometres from Nadaun city and to the side of Deotsidh (Baba Balak Nath). It covers roughly 11 square kilometres.

This small village is known for its wildlife and vegetation, featuring dense forests. Many species are native to the area including deer, nylghau, barking deer, boars and tigers. Wild hens, pheasants, woodpeckers, the Himalayan sparrow, parrots, daisy hens, and peacocks are there.

Demographics 
This village has a population of fewer than 1,000 people.

Politics 
It has an elected village panchayat (council).

References 

Villages in Hamirpur district, Himachal Pradesh